Braden may refer to:

Braden (given name)
Braden (surname)
Braden, Illinois, an unincorporated community, United States
Braden, Tennessee, a town in Fayette County, Tennessee, United States
Braden, Union County, Tennessee, an unincorporated community in Tennessee, United States
Braden, West Virginia, an unincorporated community, United States
Braden River, a river in Florida, United States
Braden (brand), a brand of winches owned by Paccar

See also
Braden Scale for Predicting Pressure Ulcer Risk